The Cabinet of José Luis Tejada Sorzano was composed of three cabinets which constituted the 94th–96th national cabinets of the Republic of Bolivia. It was led by President José Luis Tejada Sorzano, a Liberal, and was in office from 29 November 1934 to 17 May 1936.

The cabinet was formed after the armed forces ousted President Daniel Salamanca in a coup d'état and allowed his vice president, José Luis Tejada Sorzano, to assume office. It was dissolved when Tejada Sorzano was himself deposed in another coup d'état. It was the last cabinet presided over by a Liberal president.

Cabinet Ministers

Composition

First cabinet 
On 27 November 1934, President Daniel Salamanca travelled to the military headquarters in Villamontes in order to personally reorganize the high command of the armed forces. Considering this, Vice President José Luis Tejada Sorzano assumed office as acting president in Salamanca's absence on 28 November. By that point, the military had already ousted Salamanca in a coup d'état the day prior. On 29 November, Salamanca's cabinet submitted its resignation and Tejada Sorzano, still acting president, formed a new one. Tejada Sorzano formally assumed office as president on 1 December when a military commission arrived to deliver Salamanca's official resignation.

The only holdover from the previous administration was Foreign Minister David Alvéstegui Laredo who had been serving since 22 March. When Alvéstegui suddenly resigned on 5 April 1935, the position remained vacant though Carlos Víctor Aramayo, a prominent tin magnate and Minister of Finance, did hold the office as acting minister for a few days. Former President Bautista Saavedra was briefly Minister of National Defense for 14 days after which he was replaced by Gabriel Gosálvez.

Second and third cabinets 
Tejada Sorzano's second cabinet was formed on 12 April 1935. The vacancy in the Foreign Ministry was filled by Minister of Government and Justice Tomás Manuel Elío. That ministry was in turn filled by José Aguirre Espada.

Tejada Sorzano's third cabinet was formed on 6 September 1935. It was under this government that Tejada Sorzano was overthrown in a coup d'état in May 1936. Many ministers who served in his administration would support his ouster and join the government of his successor, David Toro. These included: Enrique Baldivieso, Gabriel Gosálvez, Antenor Ichazo, Luis Añez Rodríguez, and Alfredo Peñaranda.

Gallery

Notes

References

Bibliography 

 

Cabinets of Bolivia
Cabinets established in 1934
Cabinets disestablished in 1936